
Gmina Pawonków is a rural gmina (administrative district) in Lubliniec County, Silesian Voivodeship, in southern Poland.

Villages
Gmina Pawonków contains the villages and settlements of Draliny, Gwoździany, Kośmidry, Koszwice, Łagiewniki Małe, Łagiewniki Wielkie, Lipie Śląskie, Lisowice, Pawonków, Skrzydłowice and Solarnia.

Neighbouring gminas
Gmina Pawonków is bordered by the town of Lubliniec and by the gminas of Ciasna, Dobrodzień, Kochanowice, Krupski Młyn and Zawadzkie.

References

Pawonkow
Lubliniec County